Giovanni Battista Mainero (c. 1600–1657) was an Italian painter of the Baroque period, active mainly in his natal city of Genoa. He was the pupil of the painter Luciano Borzone. He died during the plague of 1657.

References

1600s births
1657 deaths
17th-century Italian painters
Italian male painters
Italian Baroque painters
Painters from Genoa
17th-century deaths from plague (disease)